Jerry Haymes (born August 30, 1940 in Vernon, Texas), raised in Clovis, New Mexico, has contributed to the body of rock 'n roll for over 50 years. Even before graduating from Clovis High, Jerry was recording at the famed Norman Petty Studios, a foreshadow of his career to come. Graduation from Clovis High School led Jerry to attend Abilene Christian University, Southern Methodist University, and Kilgore College. He also spent time studying at the London Conservatory of Music. He was boyhood friends with Roy Orbison, who he worked with on a professional level. This led Haymes to Sun Records where he was an original Sun Legends Musician and Singer (with Roy Orbison) . Over the years he has performed on many chart hits, and although some of his own records charted , the top spot eluded him. Haymes is also a member of the Rock 'n Roll Hall of Fame and Texas Music Hall of Fame .

Other interests 
Haymes involvement in the music industry has included the following positions: Recording Artist, Songwriter, Producer, Publisher, Radio DJ, and Radio Station owner. He is also a US Army veteran, having served in Europe, and in Vietnam as a warrant officer. He also spent 30 years as a Southwest Conference umpire and referee. Haymes presently, though semi-retired, still performs and works as a hospital chaplain and with various military veterans groups. He is often a guest speaker at schools and for civic groups. He serves on the board of directors for several arts and entertainment organizations and museums.

As the Texas Division Chaplain for the Sons of Confederate Veterans and also military veterans, he serves just short of 3,000 veterans in the state of Texas and throughout the Southwest. Mr Haymes is the only chaplain who has ever served under 3 different commanders . In 2011, he will be entering his 6th year in this position, making him the longest serving division chaplain on record. Jerry Haymes served with the US Army in Europe and Southeast Asia (Vietnam).

Trivia 
Artists Jerry Haymes has worked for or with:
Roy Orbison
Gene Vincent
Buddy Knox
Johnny Cash & Tommy Cash
Hank Snow
Carter Family
Wanda Jackson
Bonnie Tyler
Rick Nelson
Mel Tormé
Mahalia Jackson
Tony Pastor Orchestra
The Oak Ridge Boys
Broadway Musical Orchestra
w/ Sara Jessica Parker

Songs Haymes is known for:
"Party Doll"
"It’s A Heart Ache"
"Let’s Have A Party"
"Smile of a Clown"
"If You Catch Me Looking Up"
"That’s All"
"What Then"
"So Fine"
"Rose Marie"
"Walk Through This World With Me"
"Marry Me"

Jerry Haymes was named in 2005 as one of Billboard Magazine's Lifetime Achievement Award Winners as A Top Ten Recording Session Musician of the past 45 years.

References

1940 births
Living people
People from Vernon, Texas
American rock musicians
Abilene Christian University alumni
Southern Methodist University alumni
Kilgore College alumni
People from Clovis, New Mexico